Albert L. Veys (January 10, 1919 – January 8, 2002) was the 39th mayor of Omaha, Nebraska. He took office on June 6, 1977, after a successful write-in campaign.

Personal life 
Veys' wife was Mary Jean Veys. In 2002, Veys died two days before his 83rd birthday in Omaha, Douglas County, Nebraska, USA.

VEYS - Albert L. "Al", 82 yrs., Omaha, NE. Former Omaha Mayor. Survived by wife, Mary Jean; son and daughter - in - law, Donald and Mary Pat Veys; daughters and sons - in - law, Janice and James Nekuda, Kay and Joel Schneider, all of Omaha, Carol and Michael Ford, Plainfield, IN; 7 grandchildren; 8 great - grandchildren.

References

External links 
 

1919 births
2002 deaths
Mayors of Omaha, Nebraska
20th-century American politicians